Old St Paul's Church is a former Anglican parish church in the village of Hoddlesden, Lancashire, England. The foundation stone was laid on 27 July 1861, and the church was consecrated in June 1863. It was designed by the Lancaster architect E. G. Paley, and cost about £4,000. The church was constructed in local stone, and roofed with slates from Over Darwen. Its plan consisted of a nave, north aisle, chancel, and a west tower with a stair turret rising higher than the tower. The architectural style was Geometric. The church provided seating for 650 people. It was demolished in 1975 because of damage caused by dry rot. A new church was built, also dedicated to St Paul, on a different site adjacent to the village school.

See also

List of ecclesiastical works by E. G. Paley

References

External links
Page with a photograph of 1961

Former Church of England church buildings
Gothic Revival church buildings in England
Gothic Revival architecture in Lancashire
Churches completed in 1863
19th-century Church of England church buildings
Church buildings by E. G. Paley
Paul's Old, Hoddlesden
Buildings and structures demolished in 1975
Destroyed churches in England